Sam Parsonson (born 1989) is an Australian actor. He made his television debut at the age of 15 in the critically acclaimed Australian drama series Love My Way for two seasons. His performance in the role of Dylan earned him a nomination for a Logie Award for Most Outstanding Young Talent in 2007.. He went on to appear in the channel 7 drama 'Headland'.   His other television credits include All Saints and children's television series Double Trouble.

Sam has also accrued a list of theatre credits from a young age, including Summer Rain, Shakespeare Unleashed and Duologue from Titus and Andronicus for the Shakespeare Festival.

In 2008, Sam completed filming Steven Spielberg's US mini-series The Pacific. The 10-part tells the intertwined stories of three Marines during America's battle with the Japanese in the Pacific during World War II.

Sam also stars in the Australian 2009 horror/thriller film Coffin Rock, starring as Evan, alongside actors such as Lisa Chappell and Robert Taylor.

Filmography
 Coffin Rock (2009) as Evan
 Gallipoli (miniseries)(2015) as Dave Klein
 1% (2017)
 Birdie (2018)
 Danger Close: The Battle of Long Tan (2019 - Post-Production) as Second Lieutenant David Sabben
 Hacksaw Ridge (2016) as 96th Soldier Bob

Television
 headLand (2005) as Nathan
 All Saints (2006) as Luke Harrison (One episode)
 Love My Way (2007) as Dylan
 Double Trouble (2008) as Max
 My Place (2009) as Jeff (One episode)
 The Pacific (2010) as Lapointe
 Terra Nova (2011) as Hunter Boyce
 Gallipoli (2015) as Dave Klein

External links
 

Living people
Australian male television actors
1988 births
People educated at Scots College (Sydney)